Eyeworth (also Eyworth) is a small, rural village and civil parish in the Central Bedfordshire district of the county of Bedfordshire, England; about  east south-east of the county town of Bedford.

Eyeworth had a  population of 86 in 2001.

Geography
The eastern parish boundary borders both Hertfordshire and Cambridgeshire at the River Rhee.

Landscape

Natural England has designated the area as part of The Bedfordshire and Cambridgeshire Claylands (NCA 88).
Central Bedfordshire Council has classified the landscape as Dunton Clay Vale (5G). The majority of the parish is open, arable farmland with medium to large fields. Eyeworth lies on a ridge of land that forms part of the watershed between the River Ivel to the west and the Rhee to the east. Tributary streams and drainage channels run through the area. Field boundaries are largely short flailed, gappy hedges. The limited woodland creates a very open landscape. Occasional mature hedgerow trees and roadside oaks on grass verges are a feature.

Elevation

Geology and soil type

The centre and west of the parish lie on boulder clay; with gault to the east. The whole parish has lime-rich loamy and clayey soils with slightly impeded drainage.

History
The name is spelt Aieuuorde and Aisseuuorde in the Domesday Book. Eyeworth may mean 'island farm'. The majority of the houses are Victorian, though the seventeenth century Church Farm remains.

The widow of Francis Bacon, née Alice Barnham, lived in Eyeworth following his death, and she died there in 1650. There were a number of minor skirmishes in the parish during the Civil War and it is reputed that Oliver Cromwell visited the village and damaged some of the church's icons.

Population

Governance
Eyeworth is part of Potton ward for elections to the Central Bedfordshire Unitary Authority.

Prior to 1894, Eyeworth was administered as part of the Hundred of Biggleswade.
From 1894 until 1974 the village was in Biggleswade Rural District and from 1974 to 2009 in Mid Bedfordshire District.

Eyeworth was in the Mid Bedfordshire parliamentary constituency until 1997. Now in North East Bedfordshire, the elected member is Richard Fuller of the Conservative Party.

All Saints' Church

The village is home to a medieval church dedicated to All Saints whose building dates back to the fourteenth century and is partly constructed from Totternhoe stone. The church's fifteenth century spire was destroyed by lightning in 1967 and after the subsequent theft of the lead from its roof was replaced by a much smaller modern turret.

The interior houses a number of medieval brasses and monuments to Sir Edmund Anderson (d.1605), founder of the Anderson line who were lords of the manor, and who was also a judge during the trial of Mary, Queen of Scots.

Public services
Eyeworth is in the Potton Public Water Supply Zone (RW50). The water supplied by Anglian Water comes from groundwater boreholes and is chloraminated and classed as hard.

The Eastern Power Area of UK Power Networks is the distribution network operator for electricity. There is no natural gas supply.

The two nearest general hospitals are Bedford (Bedford Hospital NHS Trust) and Lister Hospital, Stevenage (East and North Hertfordshire NHS Trust). Ambulance services are provided by the East of England Ambulance Service NHS Trust. Bedfordshire Fire and Rescue Service and Bedfordshire Police cover the parish.

Potton is the nearest library.

Public transport
Centrebus (South) runs bus route no. 188 south to Biggleswade and Hitchin (journey time 45 minutes) and north to Wrestlingworth, Potton, and Sandy. The service is normally two hourly, daytime only, Monday to Saturday.

The nearest railway station is Biggleswade.

Notable residents
Notable residents include Sir Peter Kendall, ex President of the National Farmers Union, who farms the land around the village with his brother Richard.

References

External links

Villages in Bedfordshire
Civil parishes in Bedfordshire
Central Bedfordshire District